Victor Ginzburg (born 1957) is a Russian American mathematician who works in representation theory and in noncommutative geometry. He is known for his contributions to geometric representation theory, especially, for his works on representations of quantum groups and Hecke algebras, and on the geometric Langlands program (Satake equivalence of categories). He is currently a Professor of Mathematics at the University of Chicago.

Career

Ginzburg received his Ph.D. at Moscow State University in 1985, under the direction of Alexandre Kirillov and Israel Gelfand.

Ginzburg wrote a textbook Representation theory and complex geometry with Neil Chriss on geometric representation theory.

A paper by Alexander Beilinson, Ginzburg, and Wolfgang Soergel introduced the concept of Koszul duality (cf. Koszul algebra) and the technique of "mixed categories" to representation theory. Furthermore, Ginzburg and  Mikhail Kapranov developed Koszul duality theory for operads.

In noncommutative geometry, Ginzburg defined, following earlier ideas of Maxim Kontsevich, the notion of Calabi–Yau algebra. An important role in the theory of motivic Donaldson–Thomas invariants is played by the so-called "Ginzburg dg algebra", a Calabi-Yau (dg)-algebra of dimension 3 associated with any cyclic potential on the path algebra of a quiver.

Selected publications

References

External links

1957 births
Living people
Russian emigrants to the United States
American people of Russian-Jewish descent
Soviet Jews
Soviet mathematicians
20th-century American mathematicians
21st-century American mathematicians
University of Chicago faculty
Moscow State University alumni